Edgebrook can refer to:
 Edgebrook section of Forest Glen, Chicago, Illinois
 Edgebrook, Mercer County, New Jersey
 Edgebrook, Middlesex County, New Jersey